Canarana affinis is a species of beetle in the family Cerambycidae. It was described by Per Olof Christopher Aurivillius in 1908. It is known from Bolivia and Peru.

References

affinis
Beetles described in 1908